is a Japanese ski mountaineer and trail runner.

Miura teaches at the Hokkaido Sapporo Asahigaoka High School, Hokkaido.

Selected results (ski mountaineering) 
 2010:
 1st, Gangwon Provincial Governor's Cup, Yongpyong Ski Resort/Balwangsan
 2nd, Tsugaike race Nagano Prefecture
 2012:
 1st, Asian Championship, individual

References

External links 
 Yuji Miura, Skimountaineering.org

1950s births
Living people
Japanese male ski mountaineers
Japanese male long-distance runners
Sportspeople from Hokkaido